Siksjøen is a lake in the municipality of Os in Innlandet county, Norway.

See also
List of lakes in Norway

References

Os, Innlandet
Lakes of Innlandet